USS President Lincoln was a troop transport in the United States Navy during World War I.

Formerly the German steamer President Lincoln of the Hamburg-American Line, it was built by Harland and Wolff in Belfast being completed in 1907. Seized in New York harbor in 1917, it was turned over to the Shipping Board and transferred to the Navy for operation as a troop transport.

Having been damaged severely by her German crew, the President Lincoln underwent extensive repairs and conversion at Robin's Dry Dock and Repair Company in Brooklyn, New York before being re-commissioned as a Navy troop transport at Brooklyn on 25 July 1917. Commander Yates Stirling, Jr. was then placed in command.

Service history
The President Lincoln made five voyages from New York to France. Transporting approximately 23,000 American troops to Brest, France and St. Nazaire, four cycles were completed without incident: October–November 1917, December 1917-January 1918, February–March, and March–May. She sailed from New York on her fifth and final trip to Europe on 10 May 1918. At about 09:00 on 31 May 1918, the President Lincoln was struck by three torpedoes from the German submarine , and sank about 20 minutes later. Of the 715 people aboard, 26 men were lost with the ship, and a Lieutenant Edouard Izac was taken aboard U–90 as prisoner. They were taken to France, arriving at Brest on 2 June.

References

Further reading

External links
Photo gallery at Naval Historical Center
Photo gallery at navsource.org
Youtube video dedicated to USS President Lincoln with numerous images of the ship

World War I transports of the United States
Ships sunk by German submarines in World War I
Ships built in Belfast
Ships of the Hamburg America Line
Ocean liners
1903 ships
World War I shipwrecks in the Atlantic Ocean
Maritime incidents in 1918
Ships built by Harland and Wolff